The Primate of the Anglican Church of Canada (referred to in older documents as the Primate of All Canada or the Primate of Canada) is the primate of the Anglican Church of Canada and is elected by the General Synod of the Church from among a list of five bishops nominated by the House of Bishops. Since 1969, the role of diocesan (or metropolitan, assistant, suffragan or coadjutor) bishop is relinquished upon his or her election, as the Primate assumes the role of Chief Executive Officer of the National Church Office, which is located in Toronto. Additionally, the Primate serves as the President of the General Synod, the chair of the Council of General Synod and the chair of the House of Bishops. The Primate holds the title of Archbishop and is styled as "The Most Reverend (Name), Primate of Canada".

The Primate, while not holding the responsibility for a particular diocese, has a pastoral responsibility for the entire Anglican Church of Canada. This requires a great deal of travel throughout Canada and abroad. In addition to playing a significant administrative role, the Primate also has an important pastoral and educational role in the Church. Because the Primate does not have diocesan responsibilities, ordinations, appointments of clergy and confirmations are not a frequent part of primatial ministry. The Primate serves until age 70, or earlier resignation.

The Primate speaks in the name of the Anglican Church of Canada after consultation with, or in accordance with the policies of, the General Synod or the Council of General Synod. As well, the Primate often represents the Canadian Church in international and ecumenical partnerships and dialogues, including the Lambeth Conference, the Primates' Meetings of the Anglican Communion and at the World Council of Churches gatherings.

The current Primate is Archbishop Linda Nicholls, who was elected in July 2019 at the 41st General Synod held in the Diocese of New Westminster in Vancouver, British Columbia. She was installed in office at the close of that Synod, succeeding Fred Hiltz who had served since 2007.

List of Primates
There have been fourteen primates in the history of the Canadian church:

References

External links

Primate's webpage on the Anglican Church of Canada website

Canada, Primate of the Anglican Church of
Canada
Canada, Primate of the Anglican Church of

Anglican